"Ani vody proud" is a first single from the Holomráz album of the Czech pop music group Slza. The music was created by Lukáš Bundil and Dalibor Cidlinský Jr. and the text composed by Ondřej Ládek aka Xindl X.

Music video 
The fans of Slza, Petr Lexa and Lukáš Bundil played it. The music video was filmed in Březnice in April. Filming took three days.

References 

Slza songs
Universal Music Group singles
2017 songs
2017 singles
Songs written by Xindl X